William Gould (born 1886) was an English professional footballer who played as a midfielder and forward.

Career
Born in Burton, Gould played for Glossop, Bradford City and Manchester City.

For Bradford City he made 18 appearances in the Football League.

For Manchester City he made 8 appearances in the Football League.

Sources

References

1886 births
Year of death missing
English footballers
Glossop North End A.F.C. players
Bradford City A.F.C. players
Manchester City F.C. players
English Football League players
Association football midfielders
Association football forwards
Sportspeople from Burton upon Trent